This article lists the results for the Serbia national football team in 1945. 

The team represented the Federal State of Serbia in a tournament organised by the Football Association of Yugoslavia. As a non-FIFA member nation these matches are not considered official.

1945

See also 

 Serbia and Montenegro national football team results (1994–2006)
 Serbia national football team results
 Serbia national football team results (2006–09)
 Serbia national football team results (2010–19)
 Serbia national football team results (2020–29)

Notes 

Serbia national football team results